, also known as , is a multi-purpose gymnasium in Nagoya, Japan, built in 1964.

Overview

Located on the site of the secondary enclosure of Nagoya Castle, it is host to numerous concerts and events. 
The gymnasium has 4,375 fixed seats, and can accommodate an additional 3,032 on the floor for certain events, giving it a total maximum capacity of 7,407.

In 1966 it won the 7th annual Building Contractors Society Award.

Professional Sumo's July Grand Sumo Tournament is held here every year from the second until the fourth Sunday in July.

It is the home arena of the Nagoya Diamond Dolphins of the B.League. Dolphins acquired its naming rights  (JPY 25 million, three years) in 2018.

References

External links

Aichi Prefectural Gymnasium official site, in Japanese
Basketball seatings

Basketball venues in Japan
Indoor arenas in Japan
Sumo venues in Japan
Boxing venues in Japan
Music venues in Japan
Nagoya Diamond Dolphins
Naka-ku, Nagoya
Sports venues in Nagoya
Nagoya Castle
Sports venues completed in 1964
1964 establishments in Japan